USS Wailaki (YTB-706) was a large yard tug proposed for the United States Navy that was not built.

Wailaki was a Hisada-class large yard tug slated to be built at Terminal Island, San Pedro, California, by the Bethlehem Steel Company, but the contract for her construction was cancelled on 29 August 1945.

References

Tugs of the United States Navy
Cancelled ships of the United States Navy
Ships built in Los Angeles